Klasea pusilla, is a species in the genus Klasea  (previously in the genus Serratula). It is a native of the Eastern Mediterranean.

Description 
Klasea pusilla  has a thistle-like flower head, it flowers from April to June.

Distribution and habitat 
The plant grows in Lebanon, Syria, Israel and Jordan in Mediterranean semi-steppe shrubland.

Research and uses 
A 2014 study investigating the biological activity of Lebanese indigenous medicinal plants showed that whole plant extracts of K. pusilla has a significant repellent effect against the adult silverleaf whitefly, an important invasive agricultural pest.

References 

Cynareae
Flora of Lebanon
Taxa named by Jacques Labillardière